William W. Wilson may refer to:
 William Warfield Wilson (1868–1942), U.S. Representative from Illinois
 William Wallace Wilson, Alberta politician
 William Wilber Wilfred Wilson (1885–1964), Canadian politician

See also
 William Wilson (disambiguation)